Hendrik "Henk" Weerink (2 July 1936 – 13 March 2014) was a Dutch association football referee. He refereed between 1967 and 1983 for more than 450 matches in national and international matches. He was born in Coevorden, Drenthe.

Weerink died on 13 March 2014 in his hometown of Coevorden. He was 77 years old.

References

Other websites
 Henk Weerink at World Referee

1936 births
2014 deaths
Dutch football referees
People from Coevorden
Sportspeople from Drenthe